Jonas Dakir (born 18 April 1997) is a Danish footballer who plays as a goalkeeper for Hillerød in the Danish 1st Division.

Club career

Randers FC
Dakir joined Randers FC after being discarded from FC Midtjylland as a U16 player. He sat on the bench for the first team of Randers three times in the 2016-17 season and at the end of the season, he signed his first professional contract with the club, becoming the third choice on the goalkeeper post on the first team. He got his debut for the first team on 26 August 2017 in the Danish Cup. Dakir played two more games in that season, both in the Danish Cup as well.

In February 2018 Randers announced, that they had extended Dakir's contract from the summer 2018, where he would become a full-time professional player.

Randers sold Frederik Due in the beginning of 2019 and with his departure, Dakir became the second choice. On 27 October 2019, Dakir got his debut in the Danish Superliga against Lyngby Boldklub. Dakir came on the pitch in the 59th minute after first choice Patrik Carlgren was sent off. Two weeks later, he signed a contract extension until June 2022. He left the club at the end of the 2021-22 season.

Hillerød
On 1 August 2022, Dakir joined newly promoted Danish 1st Division club Hillerød.

Personal life
Born in Denmark, Dakir is of Moroccan descent.

Honours
Randers
Danish Cup: 2020–21

References

External links
 

1997 births
Living people
Footballers from Aarhus
Danish men's footballers
Danish people of Moroccan descent
Association football goalkeepers
Danish Superliga players
FC Midtjylland players
Randers FC players
Viby IF players
Hillerød Fodbold players